Ji Jia (born 22 January 1985) is a Chinese speed skater. She competed in three events at the 2006 Winter Olympics.

References

External links 
 
 

1985 births
Living people
Chinese female speed skaters
Olympic speed skaters of China
Speed skaters at the 2006 Winter Olympics
Asian Games medalists in speed skating
Asian Games silver medalists for China
Asian Games bronze medalists for China
Speed skaters at the 2007 Asian Winter Games
Speed skaters at the 2011 Asian Winter Games
Medalists at the 2007 Asian Winter Games
Medalists at the 2011 Asian Winter Games
Universiade bronze medalists for China
Universiade medalists in speed skating
Competitors at the 2009 Winter Universiade
Sportspeople from Jilin
20th-century Chinese women
21st-century Chinese women